Rex Haughton Hudson (born August 11, 1953) is a former pitcher in Major League Baseball. He pitched two innings for the Los Angeles Dodgers against the Atlanta Braves on July 27, 1974. He allowed a three-run home run to Hank Aaron in that game. He is a graduate of Nathan Hale High School in Tulsa Oklahoma.

References

External links

Major League Baseball pitchers
Los Angeles Dodgers players
Baseball players from Oklahoma
Living people
1953 births
Sportspeople from Tulsa, Oklahoma
Ogden Dodgers players
El Paso Dodgers players
Waterbury Dodgers players
Albuquerque Dukes players
Bakersfield Dodgers players